

Georg Haus (16 September 1895 – 16 April 1945) was a general in the Wehrmacht of Nazi Germany during World War II. He was a recipient of the Knight's Cross of the Iron Cross. Haus was killed on 16 April 1945 near Pillau, East Prussia during the Soviet Zemland Offensive. He was posthumously promoted to Generalleutnant.

Awards and decorations

 Knight's Cross of the Iron Cross on 12 February 1944 as Oberst and commander of Grenadier-Regiment 55

Notes

References

 

1895 births
1945 deaths
People from the Kingdom of Bavaria
Military personnel from Nuremberg
German Army personnel of World War I
Recipients of the clasp to the Iron Cross, 1st class
Recipients of the Gold German Cross
Recipients of the Knight's Cross of the Iron Cross
German Army personnel killed in World War II
Lieutenant generals of the German Army (Wehrmacht)
20th-century Freikorps personnel